Volunteer Eco Students Abroad (VESAbroad) is a for-profit company  founded in 2009 which has been established to give participants from around the globe the opportunity to visit a number of countries and to participate in a program consisting of some volunteer work and adventure tourism. The primary programs are generally of two weeks duration with opportunities to extend the trip with supplementary adventure tours.

Programs 
Split into two week-long sections, the program sees participants volunteering in areas of need such the areas of education, construction and conservation in a range of multi-faceted projects.

During the second week, participants are accompanied on a tour of the country which comprises a number of adventurous and/or cultural activities. The programs are aimed at broadening the participant's awareness of what these countries lack but also what they have to offer.

Some projects undertaken by VESAbroad volunteers include:
Refurbishing classrooms and water tanks at Vugalei District School in Naimasimasi, Fiji.
Teaching and promoting hygiene in Biasevu Village School on Viti Levu Island, Fiji.
Teaching English and providing maintenance for the Puka Urku village in Ecuador.
Conservation work on cheetah and crocodile farms near Saint Lucia, South Africa.
A planned trip to Ecuador in 2012 involved building and refurbishing a local school and building eco-friendly amenities for a local village.

References 

Learning programs